The 2018–19 Utah Jazz season was the 45th season of the franchise in the National Basketball Association (NBA), and the 40th season of the franchise in Salt Lake City. On March 28, the Jazz qualified the playoffs for the third straight season. The Jazz had the second best team defensive rating in the NBA.

In the playoffs, the Jazz lost to the Houston Rockets in the First Round in five games.

Draft picks

Roster

<noinclude>

Standings

Division

Conference standings

Game log

Preseason

|- style="background:#cfc;"
| 1
| September 29
| Perth
| 
| Allen (19)
| Bradley (8)
| Allen (6)
| Vivint Smart Home Arena17,685
| 1–0
|- style="background:#cfc;"
| 2
| October 2
| Toronto
| 
| Ingles (24)
| Gobert (10)
| O'Neale, Crowder, Ingles, Burks (4)
| Vivint Smart Home Arena18,306
| 2–0
|- style="background:#cfc;"
| 3
| October 5
| Adelaide
| 
| Mitchell (18)
| Udoh (10)
| Ingles (7)
| Vivint Smart Home Arena18,074
| 3–0
|- style="background:#cfc;"
| 4
| October 7
| @ Portland
| 
| Mitchell (21)
| Ingles (7)
| Ingles (5)
| Moda Center19,441
| 4–0
|- style="background:#cfc;"
| 5
| October 11
| @ Sacramento
| 
| Gobert (18)
| Favors (12)
| Rubio (6)
| Golden 1 CenterN/A
| 5–0

Regular season

|- style="background:#cfc"
| 1
| October 17
| @ Sacramento
| 
| Donovan Mitchell (24)
| Rudy Gobert (15)
| Joe Ingles (6)
| Golden 1 Center17,583
| 1–0
|- style="background:#fcc"
| 2
| October 19
| Golden State
| 
| Joe Ingles (27)
| Rudy Gobert (11)
| Ricky Rubio (10)
| Vivint Smart Home Arena18,306
| 1–1
|- style="background:#fcc"
| 3
| October 22
| Memphis
| 
| Donovan Mitchell (14)
| Rudy Gobert (12)
| Rubio, Ingles (4)
| Vivint Smart Home Arena18,306
| 1–2
|- style="background:#cfc"
| 4
| October 24
| @ Houston
| 
| Donovan Mitchell (38)
| Rudy Gobert (13)
| Donovan Mitchell (7)
| Toyota Center18,055
| 2–2
|- style="background:#cfc"
| 5
| October 27
| @ New Orleans
| 
| Ricky Rubio (28)
| Rudy Gobert (14)
| Ricky Rubio (12)
| Smoothie King Center16,373
| 3–2
|- style="background:#cfc
| 6
| October 28
| @ Dallas
| 
| Rudy Gobert (23)
| Rudy Gobert (16)
| Ricky Rubio (8)
| American Airlines Center19,571
| 4–2
|- style="background:#fcc
| 7
| October 31
| @ Minnesota
| 
| Donovan Mitchell (26)
| Rudy Gobert (13)
| Rubio, Mitchell (5)
| Target Center10,079
| 4–3

|- style="background:#fcc
| 8
| November 2
| Memphis
| 
| Ricky Rubio (22)
| Rudy Gobert (16)
| Ricky Rubio (11)
| Vivint Smart Home Arena18,306
| 4–4
|- style="background:#fcc
| 9
| November 3
| @ Denver
| 
| Jae Crowder (21)
| Rudy Gobert (12)
| Rubio, Ingles (6)
| Pepsi Center19,520
| 4–5
|- style="background:#fcc
| 10
| November 5
| Toronto
| 
| Alec Burks (22)
| Rudy Gobert (12)
| Ricky Rubio (9)
| Vivint Smart Home Arena18,306
| 4–6
|- style="background:#cfc
| 11
| November 7
| Dallas
| 
| Donovan Mitchell (23)
| Rudy Gobert (10)
| Ricky Rubio (12)
| Vivint Smart Home Arena18,306
| 5–6
|- style="background:#cfc;"
| 12
| November 9
| Boston
| 
| Joe Ingles (27)
| Rudy Gobert (15)
| Ingles, Rubio (7)
| Vivint Smart Home Arena18,306
| 6–6
|- style="background:#cfc;
| 13
| November 12
| @ Memphis
| 
| Joe Ingles (19)
| Rudy Gobert (16)
| Joe Ingles (5)
| FedExForum13,477
| 7–6
|-style="background:#fcc;
| 14
| November 14
| @ Dallas
| 
| Ricky Rubio (11)
| Rudy Gobert (10)
| Rubio, Mitchell (3)
| American Airlines Center19,371
| 7–7
|- style="background:#fcc;"
| 15
| November 16
| @ Philadelphia
| 
| Donovan Mitchell (31)
| Rudy Gobert (10)
| Rubio, Exum (4)
| Wells Fargo Center20,485
| 7–8
|- style="background:#cfc"
| 16
| November 17
| @ Boston
| 
| Donovan Mitchell (28)
| Rudy Gobert (9)
| Mitchell, Ingles (6)
| TD Garden18,624
| 8–8
|- style="background:#fcc"
| 17
| November 19
| @ Indiana
| 
| Ricky Rubio (28)
| Rudy Gobert (11)
| Ricky Rubio (6)
| Bankers Life Fieldhouse17,000
| 8–9
|- style="background:#fcc"
| 18
| November 21
| Sacramento
| 
| Donovan Mitchell (35)
| Rudy Gobert (15)
| Ingles, Rubio (7)
| Vivint Smart Home Arena19,911
| 8–10
|- style="background:#fcc"
| 19
| November 23
| @ LA Lakers
| 
| Alec Burks (17)
| Joe Ingles (8)
| Ingles, Rubio (5)
| Staples Center19,060
| 8–11
|- style="background:#cfc"
| 20
| November 25
| @ Sacramento
| 
| Ricky Rubio (27)
| Rudy Gobert (15)
| Joe Ingles (6)
| Vivint Smart Home Arena16,048
| 9–11
|- style="background:#fcc"
| 21
| November 26
| Indiana
| 
| Derrick Favors (13)
| Derrick Favors (8)
| Ricky Rubio (8)
| Vivint Smart Home Arena18,306
| 9–12
|- style="background:#cfc"
| 22
| November 28
| @ Brooklyn
| 
| Donovan Mitchell (29)
| Rudy Gobert (16)
| Joe Ingles (5)
| Barclays Center12,928
| 10–12
|- style="background:#cfc"
| 23
| November 30
| @ Charlotte
| 
| Donovan Mitchell (30)
| Rudy Gobert (17)
| Jae Crowder (7)
| Spectrum Center15,812
| 11–12

|- style="background:#fcc;"
| 24
| December 2
| @ Miami
| 
| Ricky Rubio (23)
| Rudy Gobert (18)
| Ricky Rubio (6)
| American Airlines Arena19,600
| 11–13
|- style="background:#cfc;"
| 25
| December 4
| San Antonio
| 
| Donovan Mitchell (20)
| Rudy Gobert (10)
| Ricky Rubio (7)
| Vivint Smart Home Arena18,306
| 12–13
|- style="background:#cfc;"
| 26
| December 6
| Houston
| 
| Derrick Favors (24)
| Derrick Favors (10)
| Ricky Rubio (6)
| Vivint Smart Home Arena18,306
| 13-13
|- style="background:#fcc;"
| 27
| December 9
| @ San Antonio
| 
| Donovan Mitchell (27)
| Favors, Gobert (8)
| Rudy Gobert (7)
| AT&T Center17,834
| 13–14
|- style="background:#fcc;"
| 28
| December 10
| @ Oklahoma City
| 
| Donovan Mitchell (19)
| Rudy Gobert (14)
| Raul Neto (5)
| Chesapeake Energy Arena18,203
| 13–15
|- style="background:#cfc;"
| 29
| December 12
| Miami
| 
| Donovan Mitchell (21)
| Rudy Gobert (11)
| Ricky Rubio (6)
| Vivint Smart Home Arena18,306
| 14–15
|- style="background:#fcc;"
| 30
| December 15
| @ Orlando
| 
| Donovan Mitchell (24)
| Rudy Gobert (13)
| Ricky Rubio (4)
| Mexico City Arena20,011
| 14–16
|- style="background:#fcc;"
| 31
| December 17
| @ Houston
| 
| Donovan Mitchell (23)
| Rudy Gobert (13)
| Joe Ingles (6)
| Toyota Center18,055
| 14–17
|- style="background:#cfc;"
| 32
| December 19
| Golden State
| 
| Joe Ingles (20)
| Rudy Gobert (15)
| Ricky Rubio (10)
| Vivint Smart Home Arena18,306
| 15–17
|- style="background:#cfc;"
| 33
| December 21
| @ Portland
| 
| Ricky Rubio (24)
| Rudy Gobert (11)
| Ricky Rubio (8)
| Moda Center19,127
| 16–17
|- style="background:#fcc;"
| 34
| December 22
| Oklahoma City
| 
| Gobert & Mitchell (20)
| Rudy Gobert (10)
| Ricky Rubio (14)
| Vivint Smart Home Arena18,306
| 16–18
|- style="background:#cfc;"
| 35
| December 25
| Portland
| 
| Donovan Mitchell (19)
| Rudy Gobert (14)
| Ricky Rubio (6)
| Vivint Smart Home Arena18,306
| 17–18
|- style="background:#fcc;"
| 36
| December 27
| Philadelphia
| 
| Donovan Mitchell (23)
| Rudy Gobert (15)
| Rudy Gobert (5)
| Vivint Smart Home Arena18,306
| 17–19
|- style="background:#cfc;"
| 37
| December 29
| NY Knicks
| 
| Rudy Gobert (25)
| Rudy Gobert (16)
| Dante Exum (13)
| Vivint Smart Home Arena18,306
| 18–19

|- style="background:#fcc;"
| 38
| January 1
| @ Toronto
| 
| Derrick Favors (21)
| Favors, Gobert (9)
| Ricky Rubio (8)
| Scotiabank Arena19,800
| 18–20
|- style="background:#cfc;"
| 39
| January 4
| @ Cleveland
| 
| Donovan Mitchell (18)
| Joe Ingles (9)
| Dante Exum (7)
| Quicken Loans Arena19,432
| 19–20
|- style="background:#cfc;"
| 40
| January 5
| @ Detroit
| 
| Donovan Mitchell (26)
| Rudy Gobert (11)
| Exum, Mitchell (5)
| Little Caesars Arena17,255
| 20–20
|- style="background:#fcc;"
| 41
| January 7
| @ Milwaukee
| 
| Donovan Mitchell (26)
| Rudy Gobert (15)
| Raul Neto (5)
| Fiserv Forum17,341
| 20–21
|- style="background:#cfc;"
| 42
| January 9
| Orlando
| 
| Donovan Mitchell (33)
| Rudy Gobert (14)
| Mitchell, Ingles (7)
| Vivint Smart Home Arena18,306
| 21–21
|- style="background:#cfc;"
| 43
| January 11
| LA Lakers
| 
| Donovan Mitchell (33)
| Rudy Gobert (18)
| Donovan Mitchell (9)
| Vivint Smart Home Arena18,306
| 22–21
|- style="background:#cfc;"
| 44
| January 12
| Chicago
| 
| Donovan Mitchell (34)
| Rudy Gobert (16)
| Rudy Gobert (8)
| Vivint Smart Home Arena18,306
| 23–21
|- style="background:#cfc;"
| 45
| January 14
| Detroit
| 
| Donovan Mitchell (28)
| Rudy Gobert (25)
| Joe Ingles (8)
| Vivint Smart Home Arena18,306
| 24–21
|- style="background:#cfc;"
| 46
| January 16
| @ L. A. Clippers
| 
| Donovan Mitchell (28)
| Rudy Gobert (22)
| Joe Ingles (8)
| Staples Center15,535
| 25–21
|- style="background:#cfc;"
| 47
| January 18
| Cleveland
| 
| Donovan Mitchell (24)
| Rudy Gobert (15)
| Joe Ingles (8)
| Vivint Smart Home Arena18,306
| 26–21
|- style="background:#fcc;"
| 48
| January 21
| Portland
| 
| Donovan Mitchell (26)
| Rudy Gobert (13)
| Joe Ingles (6)
| Vivint Smart Home Arena18,306
| 26–22
|- style="background:#cfc;"
| 49
| January 23
| Denver
| 
| Donovan Mitchell (35)
| Rudy Gobert (10)
| Mitchell, Rubio (6)
| Vivint Smart Home Arena18,306
| 27–22
|- style="background:#cfc;"
| 50
| January 25
| Minnesota
| 
| Donovan Mitchell (24)
| Rudy Gobert (16)
| Donovan Mitchell (11)
| Vivint Smart Home Arena18,306
| 28–22
|- style="background:#cfc;"
| 51
| January 27
| @ Minnesota
| 
| Donovan Mitchell (29)
| Derrick Favors (11)
| Ricky Rubio (8)
| Target Center14,542
| 29–22
|- style="background:#fcc;"
| 52
| January 30
| @ Portland
| 
| Donovan Mitchell (22)
| Rudy Gobert (9)
| Ricky Rubio (7)
| Moda Center19,393
| 29–23

|- style="background:#cfc;"
| 53
| February 1
| Atlanta
| 
| Rudy Gobert (25)
| Rudy Gobert (13)
| Ricky Rubio (11)
| Vivint Smart Home Arena18,306
| 30–23
|- style="background:#fcc;"
| 54
| February 2
| Houston
| 
| Donovan Mitchell (26)
| Rudy Gobert (13)
| Donovan Mitchell (9)
| Vivint Smart Home Arena18,306
| 30–24
|- style="background:#cfc;"
| 55
| February 6
| Phoenix
| 
| Donovan Mitchell (21)
| Rudy Gobert (12)
| Joe Ingles (11)
| Vivint Smart Home Arena18,306
| 31–24
|- style="background:#cfc;"
| 56
| February 9
| San Antonio
| 
| Donovan Mitchell (23)
| Rudy Gobert (13)
| Ricky Rubio (6)
| Vivint Smart Home Arena18,306
| 32–24
|- style="background:#fcc;"
| 57
| February 12
| @ Golden State
| 
| Donovan Mitchell (25)
| Rudy Gobert (16)
| Ricky Rubio (6)
| Oracle Arena19,596
| 32–25
|- style="background:#fcc;"
| 58
| February 22
| @ Oklahoma City
| 
| Donovan Mitchell (38)
| Rudy Gobert (16)
| Ricky Rubio (7)
| Chesapeake Energy Arena18,203
| 32–26
|- style="background:#cfc;"
| 59
| February 23
| Dallas
| 
| Mitchell, Rubio (25)
| Rudy Gobert (12)
| Ingles, Mitchell (6)
| Vivint Smart Home Arena18,306
| 33–26
|- style="background:#cfc;"
| 60
| February 27
| L. A. Clippers
| 
| Donovan Mitchell (32)
| Rudy Gobert (13)
| Joe Ingles (6)
| Vivint Smart Home Arena18,306
| 34–26
|- style="background:#cfc;"
| 61
| February 28
| @ Denver
| 
| Donovan Mitchell (24)
| Rudy Gobert (11)
| Joe Ingles (10)
| Pepsi Center19,520
| 35–26

|- style="background:#cfc;"
| 62
| March 2
| Milwaukee
| 
| Donovan Mitchell (46)
| Derrick Favors (17)
| Joe Ingles (8)
| Vivint Smart Home Arena18,306
| 36–26
|- style="background:#fcc;"
| 63
| March 4
| New Orleans
| 
| Crowder, Korver (20)
| Rudy Gobert (19)
| Joe Ingles (11)
| Vivint Smart Home Arena18,306
| 36–27
|- style="background:#cfc;"
| 64
| March 6
| @ New Orleans
| 
| Derrick Favors (25)
| Rudy Gobert (13)
| Ingles, Rubio (10)
| Smoothie King Center14,681
| 37–27
|- style="background:#fcc;"
| 65
| March 8
| @ Memphis
| 
| Donovan Mitchell (38)
| Jae Crowder (11)
| Joe Ingles (7)
| FedExForum15,407
| 37–28
|- style="background:#fcc;"
| 66
| March 11
| Oklahoma City
| 
| Donovan Mitchell (25)
| Rudy Gobert (12)
| Joe Ingles (8)
| Vivint Smart Home Arena18,306
| 37–29
|- style="background:#cfc;"
| 67
| March 13
| @ Phoenix
| 
| Donovan Mitchell (26)
| Rudy Gobert (20)
| Derrick Favors (7)
| Talking Stick Resort Arena18,055
| 38–29
|- style="background:#cfc;"
| 68
| March 14
| Minnesota
| 
| Donovan Mitchell (24)
| Rudy Gobert (13)
| Ricky Rubio (9)
| Vivint Smart Home Arena18,306
| 39–29
|- style="background:#cfc;"
| 69
| March 16
| Brooklyn
| 
| Donovan Mitchell (24)
| Rudy Gobert (17)
| Ricky Rubio (6)
| Vivint Smart Home Arena18,306
| 40–29
|- style="background:#cfc;"
| 70
| March 18
| @ Washington
| 
| Donovan Mitchell (19)
| Rudy Gobert (14)
| Ricky Rubio (10)
| Capital One Arena15,637
| 41–29
|- style="background:#cfc;"
| 71
| March 20
| @ N. Y. Knicks
| 
| Donovan Mitchell (30)
| Rudy Gobert (9)
| Ricky Rubio (9)
| Madison Square Garden18,530
| 42–29
|- style="background:#fcc;"
| 72
| March 21
| @ Atlanta
| 
| Donovan Mitchell (34)
| Derrick Favors (15)
| Ingles, Rubio (7)
| State Farm Arena15,569
| 42–30
|- style="background:#cfc;"
| 73
| March 23
| @ Chicago
| 
| Rudy Gobert (21)
| Rudy Gobert (14)
| Joe Ingles (5)
| United Center20,506
| 43–30
|- style="background:#cfc;"
| 74
| March 25
| Phoenix
| 
| Rudy Gobert (27)
| Rudy Gobert (10)
| Ricky Rubio (6)
| Vivint Smart Home Arena18,306
| 44–30
|- style="background:#cfc;"
| 75
| March 27
| LA Lakers
| 
| Rudy Gobert (22)
| Rudy Gobert (11)
| Joe Ingles (14)
| Vivint Smart Home Arena18,306
| 45–30
|- style="background:#cfc;"
| 76
| March 29
| Washington
| 
| Donovan Mitchell (35)
| Rudy Gobert (17)
| Joe Ingles (10)
| Vivint Smart Home Arena18,306
| 46–30

|- style="background:#cfc;"
| 77
| April 1
| Charlotte
| 
| Donovan Mitchell (25)
| Rudy Gobert (18)
| Ricky Rubio (13)
| Vivint Smart Home Arena18,306
| 47–30
|- style="background:#cfc;"
| 78
| April 3
| @ Phoenix
| 
| Donovan Mitchell (29)
| Rudy Gobert (13)
| Joe Ingles (8)
| Talking Stick Resort Arena15,797
| 48–30
|- style="background:#cfc;"
| 79
| April 5
| Sacramento
| 
| Donovan Mitchell (23)
| Rudy Gobert (11)
| Donovan Mitchell (9)
| Vivint Smart Home Arena18,306
| 49–30
|- style="background:#fcc;"
| 80
| April 7
| @ LA Lakers
| 
| Rudy Gobert (21)
| Rudy Gobert (10)
| Joe Ingles (8)
| Staples Center18,997
| 49–31
|- style="background:#cfc;"
| 81
| April 9
| Denver
| 
| Donovan Mitchell (46)
| Rudy Gobert (10)
| Joe Ingles (13)
| Vivint Smart Home Arena18,306
| 50–31
|- style="background:#fcc;"
| 82
| April 10
| @ L. A. Clippers
| 
| Grayson Allen (40)
| Ekpe Udoh (13)
| Ekpe Udoh (5)
| Staples Center17,655
| 50–32

Playoffs

Game log

|- bgcolor=ffcccc
| 1
| April 14
| @ Houston
| 
| Rudy Gobert (22)
| Rudy Gobert (16)
| Ricky Rubio (6)
| Toyota Center18,055
| 0–1
|- bgcolor=ffcccc
| 2
| April 17
| @ Houston
| 
| Rubio, O'Neale (17)
| Rudy Gobert (12)
| Ricky Rubio (9)
| Toyota Center18,055
| 0–2
|- bgcolor=ffcccc
| 3
| April 20
| Houston
| 
| Donovan Mitchell (34)
| Gobert, Ingles (8)
| Ricky Rubio (6)
| Vivint Smart Home Arena18,306
| 0–3
|- bgcolor=ccffcc
| 4
| April 22
| Houston
| 
| Donovan Mitchell (31)
| Favors, O'Neale (11)
| Ricky Rubio (11)
| Vivint Smart Home Arena18,306
| 1–3
|- bgcolor=ffcccc
| 5*
| April 24
| @ Houston
| 
| Royce O'Neale (18)
| Crowder, Gobert (10)
| Ricky Rubio (11)
| Toyota Center18,055
| 1–4

Player statistics

Regular season

|-
| align="left"| || align="center"| SG
| 38 || 2 || 416 || 23 || 25 || 6 || 6 || 211
|-
| align="left"| || align="center"| C
| 3 || 0 || 36 || 15 || 1 || 2 || 2 || 17
|-
| align="left"|† || align="center"| SG
| 17 || 0 || 269 || 27 || 20 || 6 || 4 || 143
|-
| align="left"| || align="center"| PF
| 11 || 0 || 39 || 8 || 1 || 0 || 0 || 9
|-
| align="left"| || align="center"| SF
| 80 || 11 || 2,166 || 384 || 133 || 64 || 31 || 951
|-
| align="left"| || align="center"| PG
| 42 || 1 || 664 || 68 || 110 || 14 || 5 || 288
|-
| align="left"| || align="center"| C
| 76 || 70 || 1,766 || 560 || 89 || 56 || 106 || 897
|-
| align="left"| || align="center"| C
| 81 || 80 || 2,577 || style=";"|1,041 || 161 || 66 || style=";"|187 || 1,284
|-
| align="left"| || align="center"| PF
| style=";"|82 || style=";"|82 || 2,568 || 330 || style=";"|469 || 98 || 20 || 994
|-
| align="left"|≠ || align="center"| SG
| 54 || 0 || 1,083 || 133 || 64 || 22 || 10 || 492
|-
| align="left"| || align="center"| SG
| 77 || 77 || style=";"|2,598 || 316 || 322 || style=";"|106 || 31 || style=";"|1,829
|-
| align="left"| || align="center"| SG
| 14 || 0 || 84 || 6 || 15 || 1 || 1 || 16
|-
| align="left"| || align="center"| PG
| 37 || 1 || 474 || 62 || 93 || 14 || 4 || 196
|-
| align="left"| || align="center"| PF
| 59 || 0 || 516 || 87 || 35 || 10 || 6 || 235
|-
| align="left"| || align="center"| SF
| style=";"|82 || 16 || 1,671 || 285 || 124 || 54 || 24 || 426
|-
| align="left"| || align="center"| PG
| 68 || 67 || 1,899 || 243 || 416 || 91 || 10 || 864
|-
| align="left"| || align="center"| SF
| 50 || 2 || 609 || 123 || 27 || 43 || 5 || 190
|-
| align="left"| || align="center"| C
| 51 || 1 || 320 || 90 || 28 || 10 || 31 || 119
|}
After all games.
‡Waived during the season
†Traded during the season
≠Acquired during the season

Playoffs

|-
| align="left"| || align="center"| SG
| 2 || 0 || 14 || 1 || 0 || 0 || 0 || 9
|-
| align="left"| || align="center"| SF
| style=";"|5 || 3 || 130 || 29 || 4 || 5 || 0 || 57
|-
| align="left"| || align="center"| C
| style=";"|5 || 2 || 103 || 37 || 4 || 4 || 9 || 59
|-
| align="left"| || align="center"| C
| style=";"|5 || style=";"|5 || 152 || style=";"|51 || 7 || 3 || style=";"|13 || 56
|-
| align="left"| || align="center"| PF
| style=";"|5 || style=";"|5 || 151 || 24 || 25 || 11 || 0 || 32
|-
| align="left"| || align="center"| SG
| 4 || 0 || 30 || 5 || 0 || 0 || 0 || 10
|-
| align="left"| || align="center"| SG
| style=";"|5 || style=";"|5 || style=";"|193 || 25 || 16 || 8 || 1 || style=";"|107
|-
| align="left"| || align="center"| PG
| 3 || 0 || 20 || 3 || 1 || 0 || 0 || 2
|-
| align="left"| || align="center"| PF
| style=";"|5 || 0 || 55 || 14 || 5 || 1 || 1 || 22
|-
| align="left"| || align="center"| SF
| style=";"|5 || 0 || 137 || 23 || 8 || 2 || 2 || 53
|-
| align="left"| || align="center"| PG
| style=";"|5 || style=";"|5 || 168 || 16 || style=";"|43 || style=";"|12 || 1 || 77
|-
| align="left"| || align="center"| SF
| 4 || 0 || 42 || 8 || 2 || 0 || 0 || 5
|-
| align="left"| || align="center"| C
| 2 || 0 || 6 || 0 || 0 || 0 || 0 || 0
|}

Transactions

Free agency

Re-signed

Additions

Subtractions

References

2018-19
2018–19 NBA season by team
2018 in sports in Utah
2019 in sports in Utah